The 1982 European Karate Championships, the 17th edition, was held  in Gothenburg, Sweden from May 8 to 9, 1982. The women's competition in kumite of 1982 was not in Gotheburg, but London February 27 to 28 (with juniors).

Competition

Team

Women's competition

Individual

Team

References

1982
European Karate Championships
European championships in 1982
International sports competitions in Gothenburg
Karate competitions in Sweden
1980s in Gothenburg
May 1982 sports events in the United Kingdom
1982 in British women's sport
February 1982 sports events in the United Kingdom
1982 sports events in London
International sports competitions in London
Karate competitions in the United Kingdom